Topbaş is a Turkish surname. Notable people with the surname include:

 Kadir Topbaş, Turkish architect and politician
 Mustafa Latif Topbaş, Turkish businessman
 Osman Nuri Topbaş, Turkish Sufi master

Turkish-language surnames